The Tim Taylor Award is an annual award given out at the conclusion of the ECAC Hockey regular season to the best coach in the conference as voted by the coaches of each ECAC team.

The Coach of the Year was first awarded in 1987 and every year thereafter until 2007 when it was renamed in honor of long-time Yale head coach Tim Taylor after he had retired following the 2005–06 season.

The vote for the award was split in its second year, but not since. (as of 2020)

Award winners

Winners by school

Multiple winners

References

General

Specific

External links
 ECAC Hockey Awards (Incomplete)

List of ECAC
ECAC Hockey